"LoveStoned" (also known as "LoveStoned/I Think She Knows") is a song by American singer and songwriter Justin Timberlake from his second studio album, FutureSex/LoveSounds (2006). It was released on June 29, 2007. It was written and produced by Timberlake, Timothy "Timbaland" Mosley and Nate "Danja" Hills. In contrast to the album's theme about sexual innuendos with themes of love, "LoveStoned" contains sexually suggestive lyrics. Musically "LoveStoned" is an upbeat dance song, contrasting with the interlude of "I Think She Knows" which has a more slow, quiet, guitar-driven sound. The song won the Grammy Award for Best Dance Recording at the 2008 ceremony. The official remix by Justice, Tiësto and Kaskade was released later.

Background and release 

After  the release of his debut solo album Justified in 2002, Timberlake thought he "lost his voice" in the sense that he did not like what he was doing. He felt "burnt out" after Justified; this partly changed his career's direction, wherein he took a break from the music industry and instead appeared in films.  When he felt inspired to compose songs again, he did not choose to reunite with his former band NSYNC, although he considered doing it after his first record. Instead, he went to former Justified collaborator Timbaland's studio in Virginia Beach, Virginia to begin sessions for his second album. However, not one of them had an idea of what the album would be–no plan for it and even a title. "LoveStoned / I Think She Knows" was written by Justin Timberlake, Timbaland, and Nate "Danja" Hills as a sexual love song. In an interview with MTV News, while promoting his second album, FutureSex/LoveSounds, Timberlake revealed that the first half of the album generally focuses on sex. "LoveStoned" contains sexually suggestive lyrics, with the line, "She's going home with me tonight". "LoveStoned" was originally scheduled to be released to mainstream radio in the United States in April 2007.

Composition 

"LoveStoned/I Think She Knows" is an R&B and art rock song. The song is composed in the key of F minor and is set in time signature of common time with a tempo of 120 beats per minute. The first part of the song, "LoveStoned", starts off to "a boast" and the interlude "I Think She Knows" transitions into "an adoring two-minute love song about someone special". The song also includes "human beatbox sounds". The musicscape features string arrangements on both songs and includes Timberlake's "famous falsetto". In an interview with Rolling Stone, Timberlake admitted that the "drony guitar interlude" featured in "I Think She Knows" was inspired by the alternative rock band Interpol. The Guardian's Alexis Petridis said of the unexpected shift in tone, "the sweaty, slap-bass funk vanishes, in favour of vigorously strummed, vaguely Sonic Youth-ish guitars, luscious strings and a gorgeous Kraftwerk-inspired counter-melody." Martin Turenne of The Georgia Straight described "LoveStoned" as "a space-age disco track in which he [Timberlake] rhapsodizes about a statuesque goddess who casts a lustfully narcotic spell, leaving him defenceless against her predatory wiles". Russell Baillie of The New Zealand Herald reported that the song has a "prowling funk" sound. Jon Pareles of The New York Times noted that the sound was similar of recording artist Michael Jackson's 1983 song "Billie Jean". Pareles concluded that the track's "pulsating guitar arrangement" were those similar to rock band U2.

Christy Lemire of the Associated Press described the theme of the song as, "Justin sees a gorgeous girl on the floor and longs to bring her back to the VIP Room and/or just cut to the chase and take her directly home". Barry Schwartz of Stylus magazine interpreted Timberlake's point of view, citing that "LoveStoned" is "high from sex". Cameron Adams of the Herald Sun said that FutureSex/LoveSounds is a "bedroom" album and included "LoveStoned" as part of it. Turenne concluded that the single is not just a song, "it's the start of an S&M porno script".

Critical response 

In the Entertainment Weekly review of the album, critic Chris Willman wrote: "Superior tracks, like 'LoveStoned' and 'What Comes Around', suggest a happy middle path, where Timberlake can equally embrace Timbaland's canny beats and his own vocal helium." Tim Finney of Pitchfork Media described the song as "brilliantly ... tight, clipped disco funk" and went onto say that it "descends precipitously into the gorgeous melancholy of 'I Think That She Knows', all MOR-rock guitar churn and weightless strings, the same chorus ... transformed from infatuation to the paranoid and elegiac admission of an addict". Lauren Murphy of Entertainment.ie noted "LoveStoned" as excellent and "a sexy, layered affair with inspired violin intervals, and the consecutive interlude is a classy sliver of deftly-produced pop". Lucy Davies of the BBC wrote: "'LoveStoned' is a great track, with chopping violins, beatboxing, and bongos. 'I Think She Knows', the interlude which follows, is quite beautiful, shimmering, and brilliantly constructed." Jonah Weiner of Blender wrote, "From the grinding 'SexyBack' to the percolating 'LoveStoned' ... the vibe is all infectious, feverish build-up." Rolling Stone believed that "LoveStoned/I Think She Knows" was the "madcap peak" of the "historic creative roll" of Timberlake and Timbaland, describing the song as "flowing from hip-hop bump-and-grind to an ambient wash of Interpol-inspired guitar drone."

 At the 50th Grammy Awards, "LoveStoned" won a Grammy Award in the category of Best Dance Recording. It was ranked at the number four spot on Entertainment Weekly's "Best Songs of 2007".

French electronic duo Justice released a remixed version of "LoveStoned" in July 2007. Dutch musician Tiësto was asked to remix "LoveStoned" and released his version of the song on his weekly radio show titled Tiësto's Club Life, which he then later released on iTunes. Guitarist Kaki King recorded a cover portion of "I Think She Knows" for Engine Room Recordings' compilation album Guilt by Association Vol. 2, which was released in November 2008. "Penn Masala", the popular South Asian fusion a cappella group, recorded an a cappella cover of "LoveStoned" fused with the song "Ya Ali" from the Bollywood film, Gangster. The song was chosen for Best of A Cappella (BOCA) 2010.

Commercial performance 
In North America, the single was officially solicited to radio in June 2007. "LoveStoned" appeared on the Billboard Hot 100, and debuted at number 85, at number 17 in the Hot Digital Songs chart. It appeared on Billboard's Pop 100 in the number seven position. "LoveStoned/I Think She Knows" reached the number one spot on Billboard's Hot Dance Club Play and Hot Dance Airplay. Upon release, "LoveStoned/I Think She Knows" was downloaded 39,000 times on iTunes as of February 2007. As of 2018, the song has sold 1.12 million copies in the country.

The track peaked within the top ten in nine countries. "LoveStoned" appeared in the UK Singles Chart on June 23, 2007, in the number 63 position. It peaked at number 11, spent nineteen weeks on the chart, before retiring at number 95. The song attained top five positions in the Netherlands, South Africa, and Turkey, and entered the top ten in Denmark, Finland, Italy, and Sweden.

Music video 
Directed by Robert Hales, filming for the music video took place at Web Studios in Salford, England. In order for the lighting effects, Timberlake and Hales were required to use 600 kilowatts of lighting power, the most the studios ever used. Visual effects for the video were produced by the multi-disciplinary design studio, Blind.

In the video, Timberlake is illustrated in the form of a blue frequency. Throughout this portion of the video, a woman and a heart are also seen in this form. Mid-way in the song, Timberlake can be seen playing an electric guitar. Also, the first half of the "I Think She Knows Interlude" is cut out in the video. At the end, Timberlake is shown singing in a white background with electronic pulses traveling along the hills behind him, symbolizing his state of mind is in a trance.

The video for "LoveStoned/I Think She Knows" premiered on Yahoo! Music on June 13, 2007, and on MuchMusic's MuchOnDemand on June 14, 2007. Total Request Live (TRL) premiered the video on June 18 and it debuted at number nine on June 19.

Live performances 
Timberlake performed "LoveStoned" live at MTV Europe Music Awards 2006 at the 2007 MTV Video Music Awards. and again at the Victoria's Secret Fashion Show.

The song was part of the set list for FutureSex/LoveShow (2007), Legends of the Summer (2013), The 20/20 Experience World Tour (2013–15) and The Man of the Woods Tour (2018–19).

In addition it was featured on the setlist for three editions of Rock in Rio in 2013, 2014 and 2017.

Charts

Weekly charts

Year-end charts

Certifications

Release history

See also
 List of number-one dance singles of 2007 (U.S.)

References

2006 songs
2007 singles
Dance-pop songs
Justin Timberlake songs
Number-one singles in Turkey
Song recordings produced by Danja (record producer)
Song recordings produced by Timbaland
Music videos directed by Robert Hales
Songs written by Justin Timberlake
Songs written by Timbaland
Songs written by Danja (record producer)
Grammy Award for Best Dance Recording
Song recordings produced by Justin Timberlake
Jive Records singles